Mimachrostia is a genus of moths of the family Erebidae first described by Shigero Sugi in 1982. It was formerly placed in the family Noctuidae.

Species
Mimachrostia fasciata Sugi, 1982
Mimachrostia fasciata fasciata
Mimachrostia fasciata minimus Fibiger, 2010
Mimachrostia parafasciata Fibiger, 2008
Mimachrostia costafasciata Fibiger, 2008
Mimachrostia novofasciata Fibiger, 2010

References

Micronoctuini
Noctuoidea genera